The 2nd annual Berlin International Film Festival was held from 12 to 25 June 1952. The FIAPF prohibited the festival from awarding any official prizes by a jury (which only Cannes and Venice were qualified to do so),  instead awards were given by audience voting. This was changed in 1956 when the FIAPF granted Berlin "A-Status" during that year.

Golden Bear was awarded to Swedish film Hon dansade en sommar by audience vote. Orson Welles's Othello was banned from the festival due to his alleged anti-German remarks. The festival held a retrospective on silent films.

Films in competition
The following films were in competition for the Golden Bear award:

Key
{| class="wikitable" width="550" colspan="1"
| style="background:#FFDEAD;" align="center"| †
|Winner of the main award for best film in its section
|}

Awards
The following prizes were awarded by audience votes: 
 Golden Bear: Hon dansade en sommar by Arne Mattsson
 Silver Bear: Fanfan la Tulipe by Christian-Jaque
 Bronze Berlin Bear: Cry, the Beloved Country by Zoltán Korda

References

External links
  Berlin International Film Festival 1952
1952 Berlin International Film Festival
Berlin International Film Festival:1952 at Internet Movie Database

02
1952 film festivals
1952 in West Germany
1950s in Berlin
June 1952 events in Europe